The Old Weber Implement and Automobile Company, at 1900 Locust St. in St. Louis, Missouri, was listed on the National Register of Historic Places in 2008.

It is a two-part commercial block building, and has also been known as the Schoelhorn-Albrecht Machine Company Building.

See also
Weber Implement and Automobile Company Building, the "new" one, also NRHP-listed

References

National Register of Historic Places in St. Louis
Buildings and structures in St. Louis